Vladimir Zuyev (born 11 January 1961) is a Belarusian sailor. He competed in the Star event at the 1996 Summer Olympics.

References

External links
 

1961 births
Living people
Belarusian male sailors (sport)
Olympic sailors of Belarus
Sailors at the 1996 Summer Olympics – Star
Place of birth missing (living people)